The Nymph of Fontainebleau, also known as the Nymph of Anet or the Nymph with the Stag, is a 1543 bronze relief (Paris, Louvre, MR 1706), created by the Italian sculptor Benvenuto Cellini for the Château de Fontainebleau in France. It features a long-limbed reclining nude female nymph with a stag, wild boars, dogs, and other animals. It was Cellini's first large scale bronze casting.

History 
The sculpture was commissioned by François I, executed in Cellini's workshop at the Hôtel de Nesle (adjacent to the Tour de Nesle) in Paris, sculpted with the help of Thomas Dambry, Pierre Bontemps and Laurent Mailleu, and assembled with the help of foundrymen Pierre Villain and Guillaume Saligot. Originally intended to be placed in the tympanum in the arch above the entrance of the Porte Dorée ("Golden Gate") at the Château de Fontainebleau, it was never installed there, but instead was used by the architect Philibert de L'Orme, who put it above the entrance gate (built ) of the Château d'Anet, where the nymph became identified with Diana, the goddess of the hunt, representing the owner of the château, Diane de Poitiers, and the stag with her lover Henri II of France.

The relief was seized on 23 March 1794, at the time of the French Revolution, and moved from Anet to the Nesle depot. According to the French historian , it was initially intended for the Musée des Monuments Français in Paris and was later replaced in Anet by a painted plaster cast. On 23 February 1796, the Conservatoire des Arts decided it should be moved to the small courtyard of the Louvre, but in 1797, when it was actually moved to the Louvre, it was placed in the gallery of the museum.

After the sculpture's restoration in 1811 by the father and son founder-chasers (French: ciseleurs) Delafontaine, it was installed by the architect Pierre-François Fontaine over the Caryatides Balcony in the Salle des Caryatides of the Lescot Wing, where it remained until 1847, when it was replaced with a cast by Antoine-Louis Barye and transferred to the Sculptures rooms. It was later moved to a landing of the Mollien Staircase above the ground floor of the Denon Wing of the Louvre, but according to the Louvre website is not currently on display.

See also 

 Fountain of Diana
 Diana of Versailles
 Perseus with the Head of Medusa
 Cellini Salt Cellar

Notes

Bibliography 
 Babelon, Jean-Pierre (1989). Châteaux de France au siècle de la Renaissance. Paris: Picard. .
 Dunlop, Ian (1996). The Companion Guide to The Country Round Paris. Rochester: New York. . Originally published 1979 as The Companion Guide to the Ile de France. Revised paperback edition 1986. Reissued 1996.
 Nova, Alessandro (1996). "Cellini, Benvenuto", vol. 6, pp. 139–150, in The Dictionary of Art, 34 volumes, edited by Jane Turner. New York: Grove. . Also at Oxford Art Online.
 Roy, Maurice (1929). Artistes et monuments de la Renaissance en France. Richesses nouvelles et documents inédits / I. - 1re partie.. Paris: Librairie ancienne Honoré Champion. .
 Wheeler, Daniel (1979). The Chateaux of France. London: Octopus Books. .

1540s sculptures
Sculptures by Benvenuto Cellini
Reliefs in France
Sculptures of dogs
Deer in art
Pigs in art
Italian sculptures of the Louvre